Bungin Tambun III is a village in Padang Guci Hulu district, Kaur Regency in Bengkulu province and is one of three villages in the district with the name "Bungin Tambun". Its population is 485.

Climate
Bungin Tambun III has a cold subtropical highland climate (Cfb) with heavy rainfall year-round.

References

Villages in Bengkulu